Enid del Carmen Rivera Velázquez (born November 7, 1980) is an American female freestyle wrestler from Puerto Rico. She participated in 2008 FILA Wrestling World Championships in the 55 kg. category.

References

External links
 Wrestler profile on 2008 FILA World Championships official website

Living people
1980 births
Puerto Rican female sport wrestlers